Alcaligenes defragrans is a Gram-negative, oxidase- and catalase-positive, strictly aerobic, motile bacterium from the genus Alcaligenes.

References

Burkholderiales
Bacteria described in 1998